The Carlos Palanca Memorial Awards for Literature winners in the year 1996 (rank, title of winning entry, name of author).


English division
Novel
Grand prize: “Recuerdo” by Cristina Pantoja-Hidalgo

Short story
First prize: “The Late Comer” by Carlos Ojeda Aureus
Second prize: “Memory of Walking” by Antonio Jocson
Third prize: “The Fairy Prinsoid” by Carmelo Juino, S.J.

Short story for children
First prize: “Pure Magic” by Lakambini A. Sitoy
Second prize: “The Gem” by Lina B. Diaz de Rivera
Third prize: “The Daughter of the Wind” by Angelo Rodriguez Lacuesta

Poetry
First prize: “Twenty-fifth Fly” by Ramil Digal Gulle
Second prize: “Something Like Remembrance” by Ruel S. De Vera
Third prize: “Second Skin” by Conchitina Cruz

Essay
First prize: “Translations in the Wilderness: The Politics and Aesthetics of Subduing Colonial Spaces” by Ma. Luisa A. Igloria
Second prize: “Short Circuit: Expariate Themes in Philippine Poetry in English” by Jose Wendell Capili
Third prize: “The Irish Bard” by Joselito Zulueta

One-act play
First prize: No winner
Second prize: No winner
Third prize: “The Feline Curse” by Glenn Sevilla Mas

Full-length play
No winners

Filipino division
Novel
Grand prize: “Malaybay” by Edmund Coronel

Short story
First prize: “Pag-uugat, Pagpapakpak” by Levy Balgos Dela Cruz
Second prize: “Kasal” by Eli Rueda Guieb III
Third prize: “Miss Jones” by Jimmuel C. Naval

Short story for children
First prize: “Ang Tsinelas ni Inoy” by Renato Vibiesca
Second prize: “Tuldok” by Ma. Corazon Paulina Remegio
Third prize: “Ang Mahiyaing Manok” by Rebecca T. Añonuevo

Poetry
First prize: “Lupain ng Kapangyarihan” by Roberto T. Añonuevo
Second prize: “Bago ang Babae” by Rebecca T. Añonuevo
Third prize: “Bago Mo Ako Ipalaot” by Luna Sicat-Cleto

Essay
First prize: “Tadhana at Talinhaga” by Buenaventura S. Medina Jr.
Second prize: “Nang Binihag ng Titik ang Bibig” by Ma. Stella Valdez
Third prize: “Pagsusuri at Pagkabighani sa mga Nobela ng Pag-ibig” by Josephine Barrios

One-act play
First prize: “Huling Panauhin” by Jose Victor Z. Torres
Second prize: “Ang Mahabang Patlang ay Isang Malaking Katanungan” by Jose Jay B. Cruz
Third prize: “Lipad, Narda, Lipad” by Mervin C. Salazar

Full-length play
First prize: No winner
Second prize: “Balanggiga” by Rodolfo C. Vera
Third prize: “Los Indios Bravos” by Jose Bernard Capino

Teleplay
First prize: “Sa Daigdig ng mga Taksil” by Rodolfo R. Lana Jr.
Second prize: “Closing Time” by Rolando F. Santos
Third prize: “Sa Bingit ng Bagong Buhay” by Ma. Clarissa Estuar

Screenplay
First prize: "Mga Bangka sa Tag-araw" by Rodolfo R. Lana Jr.
Second prize: No winner
Third prize: No winner

References
 

Palanca Awards
Palanca Awards, 1996